The Lestidae are a rather small family of cosmopolitan, large-sized, slender damselflies,
known commonly as the spreadwings or spread-winged damselflies.

Characteristics
While most damselflies rest with their wings folded together, most members of the family Lestidae hold them at an angle away from their bodies.  The pterostigma (a single dark spot in the meshwork of the leading edge near the tip of each wing) is noticeably elongated. The quadrilateral (a part of the wing venation, close to the body) has an acute angle at the end. The body has a greenish, metallic shine. The superior anal appendages, commonly called claspers (body parts of male insect for clasping the female during copulation) of male spreadwings are long and strongly curved.

Breeding takes place in slow-moving or still water in stream backwaters, swamps, marshes and temporary pools. The nymphs have a long abdomen and a distinctive prementum (part of the lower lip). There is one generation per year in North American species.

Taxonomy

The two subfamilies in Lestidae are Lestinae and Sympecmatinae. Damselflies in the Lestinae rest with their wings partly open, while those in the Sympecmatinae, the reedlings, ringtails, and winter damselflies, rest with their wings folded. The exact taxonomy of the family is disputed, with some authorities including twelve genera and some eight.
Genera include:

See also

List of damselflies of the world (Lestidae)

References 

 
Odonata families
Odonata of Europe
Odonata of Australia
Odonata of Oceania
Odonata of Africa
Odonata of New Zealand
Odonata of North America
Taxa named by Philip Powell Calvert
Insects described in 1901
Damselflies